Aurora was launched at Whitby in 1789. Between 1799 and 1806 she made four voyages as a whaler to the British southern whale fishery. She was last listed in 1809 with stale data since her whaling voyages.

Career
Aurora first appeared in the Register of Shipping (RS) in 1800 with J.Bevan, master, Mellish & Co. owner, and trade London–South Seas. It gave her origin simply as "British", and stated that she had undergone a thorough repair. By the 1802 volume the RS showed Auroras master as Massey, her origin as Whitby, and her having undergone the thorough repair in 1799.

Aurora first appeared in Lloyd's Register (LR) in 1802 with S. Macey, master, Millen & Co., owner, and trade London–Southern Fishery.

Peter Mellish owned Aurora for all four of her whaling voyages.
 1st whaling voyage (1799–1801): Captain Stephen Macey (or Macy, or Massey) sailed from London on 3 May 1799, bound for Walvis Bay. Aurora returned to London on 15 April 1801.2nd whaling voyage (1801–1802): Captain James Birnie acquired a letter of marque on 2 June 1801. Aurora left England on 23 June, and returned on 4 July 1804.3rd whaling voyage (1803–1804): Captain Thomas Gray (or Gay, or Thomas Goyes), sailed from England on 21 February 1803. He sailed during the Peace of Amiens and so did not acquire a letter of marque. Aurora returned on 6 April 1804. 4th whaling voyage (1804–1806): Captain Peter Long acquired a letter of marque on 4 July 1804. Captain Peleg Long sailed from England on 4 September 1804.  reported that Aurora had been at Saint Helena on 26 March 1806, having arrived from Brazil with 200 barrels of sperm oil and 300 barrels of whale oil. Aurora returned to England on 10 June 1806.

Fate 
Aurora was last listed in 1809 with stale data since her whaling voyages.  

Citations and referencesCitationsReferences'
  

1789 ships
Ships built in Whitby
Age of Sail merchant ships of England
Whaling ships